Henry Montague (July 30, 1813June 1, 1909) was a Michigan politician.

Early life
Montague was born on July 30, 1813 in Hadley, Massachusetts. Montague moved to Michigan in 1835.

Career
Montague was a farmer. On November 8, 1854, Montague was elected to the Michigan House of Representatives where he represented the Kalamazoo County 2nd district from January 3, 1855 to December 31, 1856. Montague was a Republican, but it is unclear if he carried this party affiliation during his time in the legislature or only afterwards. Montague served as a trustee to an asylum in Michigan from 1857 to 1859. In 1859, Montague was appointed to the position of asylum steward which he served as until October 1, 1885.

Death
Montague died in Kalamazoo, Michigan on June 1, 1909. Montague was interred at the Grand Prairie Cemetery in Westwood, Michigan.

See also
Henry Montague House

References

1813 births
1909 deaths
Burials in Michigan
Farmers from Michigan
People from Hadley, Massachusetts
Politicians from Kalamazoo, Michigan
Republican Party members of the Michigan House of Representatives
19th-century American politicians